The Roman Catholic Diocese of Sete Lagoas is a diocese located in the city of Sete Lagoas in the Ecclesiastical province of Belo Horizonte in Brazil.

History
 July 16, 1955: Established as Diocese of Sete Lagoas from the Metropolitan Archdiocese of Belo Horizonte and Metropolitan Archdiocese of Diamantina

Leadership
 Bishops of Sete Lagoas (Roman rite), in reverse chronological order 
 Bishop Francisco Cota de Oliveira (2020.06.10 -
 Bishop Aloísio Jorge Pena Vitral (2017.09.20 - 2020.06.10)
 Bishop Guilherme Porto (1999.10.27 – 2017.09.20)
 Bishop José de Lima (1981.06.07 – 1999.10.27)
 Bishop Daniel Tavares Baeta Neves (1964.06.04 – 1980.07.08)
 Bishop José de Almeida Batista Pereira (1955.11.07 – 1964.04.02)

References

Sources
 GCatholic.org
 Catholic Hierarchy

Roman Catholic dioceses in Brazil
Christian organizations established in 1955
Sete Lagoas, Roman Catholic Diocese of
Roman Catholic dioceses and prelatures established in the 20th century
1955 establishments in Brazil